Fuencarral is a station on Line 10 of the Madrid Metro. It is located in fare Zone A.

References 

Line 10 (Madrid Metro) stations
Railway stations in Spain opened in 1982
Buildings and structures in Fuencarral-El Pardo District, Madrid